The Waite-Davis House (also known as the Leslie P. Waite House) is a historic home in Apopka, Florida. It is located at 5 South Central Avenue. On August 2, 1990, it was added to the U.S. National Register of Historic Places.

References

External links
 Orange County listings at National Register of Historic Places
 Orange County listings at Florida's Office of Cultural and Historical Programs

Gallery

Houses on the National Register of Historic Places in Florida
National Register of Historic Places in Orange County, Florida
Houses in Orange County, Florida
Apopka, Florida
Houses completed in 1886
Vernacular architecture in Florida
1886 establishments in Florida